Come On, Rangers is a 1938 American Western musical film directed by Joseph Kane and starring Roy Rogers.

Plot
The Texas Rangers are disbanded, so Roy joins the Cavalry but deserts when the Cavalry can't stop the outlaws and his brother dies because of it.

Cast
 Roy Rogers as Roy Rogers
 Lynne Roberts as Janice Forbes
 Raymond Hatton as Jeff
 J. Farrell MacDonald as Colonel Forbes
 Purnell Pratt as Senator Harvey
 Harry Woods as Morgan Burke
 Bruce MacFarlane as Lieutenant Nelson
 Lane Chandler as Ken Rogers
 Chester Gunnels as Smith
 Lee Powell as Ranger Earp

Soundtrack
 Roy Rogers and other Texas Rangers – "Song of the West" (Written by Eddie Cherkose and Walter Kent)
 Roy Rogers – "Let Me Hum a Western Song" (Written by Eddie Cherkose and Walter Kent)
 Roy Rogers – "I've Learned a Lot About Women" (Written by Johnny Marvin)
 Roy Rogers and soldiers – "Tenting Tonight on the Old Camp Ground" (Written by Walter Kittredge)

External links

 
 
 

1938 films
1938 Western (genre) films
American Western (genre) films
American black-and-white films
1930s English-language films
Republic Pictures films
Films directed by Joseph Kane
1930s American films